Thomas Zingler (born 21 August 1970) is an Austrian former footballer.

References

1970 births
Living people
Association football defenders
Austrian footballers
Austrian Football Bundesliga players
FC Admira Wacker Mödling players
SK Rapid Wien players